Dušan Đokić (also transliterated Dušan Djokić; born February 20, 1980) is a Serbian former footballer.

Career

Serbian clubs
In his career he played for Topličanin, Dinamo Pančevo, Rad, Zemun, Obilić, Železnik, Voždovac, but his career started taking off when he joined Red Star Belgrade in January 2006. Almost 26 years of age at this point, Đokić had a great half-season scoring 8 goals from 9 league appearances during the second half of the 2005–06 season, helping Red Star to the league title.

He scored 14 goals over his next full season at Red Star, becoming the club's top striker en route to another league championship.

Club Brugge
During summer 2007, he was sold to Club Brugge.

Loans
In January 2009 he was loaned to AC Omonoia for six months. In September 2009, he was loaned to Astra Ploiești for another four months.

On 10 March 2010 Club Brugge officially sold on loan Serbian striker to Chinese Chongqing Lifan of China's first division, the expert player's contract with the Belgian club expires in June 2011.

Zagłębie Lubin
In summer 2010, he joined Zagłębie Lubin on a two-year contract.

Najran
He signed a two-year contract with Saudi Professional League side Najran SC on 5 September 2011.

Dinamo Pančevo
In the Winter 2013, he joined FK Dinamo Pančevo.

Honours
Red Star Belgrade
Serbian SuperLiga: 2005–06, 2006–07
Serbian Cup: 2005–06, 2006–07

References

External links
 
 
 
 
 
  

1980 births
Living people
Serbian footballers
Serbian expatriate footballers
FK Dinamo Pančevo players
FK Rad players
FK Zemun players
FK Obilić players
FK Železnik players
FK Voždovac players
FK Smederevo players
Red Star Belgrade footballers
Serbian First League players
Serbian SuperLiga players
Club Brugge KV players
Belgian Pro League players
Expatriate footballers in Belgium
AC Omonia players
Cypriot First Division players
FC Astra Giurgiu players
Zagłębie Lubin players
Expatriate footballers in Cyprus
Liga I players
Expatriate footballers in Romania
Chongqing Liangjiang Athletic F.C. players
Chinese Super League players
Expatriate footballers in China
Serbian expatriate sportspeople in China
Najran SC players
Expatriate footballers in Saudi Arabia
Association football forwards
Expatriate footballers in Poland
Serbian expatriate sportspeople in Poland
People from Prokuplje